Hudson Township is a civil township of Mackinac County in the U.S. state of Michigan.  As of the 2010 census, the township population was 181.

Communities 
This was a stop on the Minneapolis, St. Paul and Sault Ste. Marie Railway named Welch in 1891. A settlement had developed around a sawmill and general store. A post office opened with the name Welch on November 4, 1898. The name was changed to Garnet on December 31, 1904, and was discontinued on February 4, 1972. It was a rural branch/CPO until January 13, 1978.
It was the headquarters for the D. N. McLeod Lumber Company. Canadian bankers financed building the railroad through here, and the settlement is said to have been named in honor of the king of England. A post office opened April 16, 1901 and was discontinued September 1, 1961. It became a station/branch until June 30, 1968.

Geography

Attractions
 Garlyn Zoo is located within Hudson Township along U.S. Route 2.
 Garnet Lake State Forest Campground
 Hog Island Point State Forest Campground

Highways
  runs east–west along the southern edge of the township along the Lake Michigan coastline.
 , known locally as Hiawatha Trail, runs east–west through the center of the township.

Demographics
As of the census of 2000, there were 214 people, 94 households, and 59 families residing in the township.  The population density was 3.1 per square mile (1.2/km2).  There were 227 housing units at an average density of 3.3 per square mile (1.3/km2).  The racial makeup of the township was 64.02% White, 26.64% Native American, 2.80% from other races, and 6.54% from two or more races. Hispanic or Latino of any race were 3.27% of the population.

There were 94 households, out of which 24.5% had children under the age of 18 living with them, 58.5% were married couples living together, 5.3% had a female householder with no husband present, and 36.2% were non-families. 33.0% of all households were made up of individuals, and 8.5% had someone living alone who was 65 years of age or older.  The average household size was 2.28 and the average family size was 2.90.

In the township the population was spread out, with 22.9% under the age of 18, 6.1% from 18 to 24, 22.4% from 25 to 44, 34.1% from 45 to 64, and 14.5% who were 65 years of age or older.  The median age was 43 years. For every 100 females, there were 101.9 males.  For every 100 females age 18 and over, there were 108.9 males.

The median income for a household in the township was $26,250, and the median income for a family was $29,375. Males had a median income of $26,250 versus $18,750 for females. The per capita income for the township was $13,025.  About 22.2% of families and 27.2% of the population were below the poverty line, including 39.7% of those under the age of eighteen and 13.2% of those 65 or over.

References

Townships in Mackinac County, Michigan
Townships in Michigan
Michigan populated places on Lake Michigan